The Rhytismataceae are a family of fungi in the Rhytismatales order. It contains 55 genera and 728 species.

Genera

According to the 2007 Outline of Ascomycota, the following genera are in the Rhytismataceae. The placement of the genus Nymanomyces is uncertain.

Bifusella —
Bifusepta —
Bivallium —
Canavirgella —
Ceratophacidium —
Cerion —
Coccomyces —
Colpoma —
Criella —
Davisomycella —
Discocainia —
Duplicaria —
Duplicariella —
Elytroderma —
Hypoderma —
Hypodermella —
Hypohelion —
Isthmiella —
Lirula —
Lophodermella —
Lophodermium —
Lophomerum —
Marthamyces —
Meloderma —
Moutoniella —
Myriophacidium —
Nematococcomyces —
Neococcomyces —
Nothorhytisma —
Nymanomyces —
Parvacoccum —
Ploioderma —
Propolis —
Pureke —
Rhytisma —
Soleella —
Sporomega —
Terriera —
Therrya —
Triblidiopsis —
Virgella —
Vladracula —
Xyloschizon —
Zeus

References 

Leotiomycetes
Ascomycota families
Taxa named by François Fulgis Chevallier
Taxa described in 1826